Friedrich von Hollmann (19 January 1842 – 21 January 1913) was an Admiral of the German Imperial Navy (Kaiserliche Marine) and Secretary of the German Imperial Naval Office under Emperor Wilhelm II.

Naval career
Hollmann was born in Berlin, Germany. In 1859-1862 he took part in the expedition to the Far East along with Karl Eduard Heusner whom he would follow years later as Secretary of the German Imperial Naval Office.
 
In 1863 he was appointed to the Central Division (Zentralabteilung) of the Prussian Navy Department.

During the Second Schleswig War in 1864 he commanded the gunboat SMS Wolf, and then (1864–1867) served as a Lieutenant aboard the cadet school ship . From 1867 to 1869 he was assigned to the naval school in Kiel.

In Franco-Prussian War in 1870-71 Hollmann was a Kapitänleutnant, then (1871–1873) served the expedition to North and South America aboard .

On 20 May 1883 the German ship was stationed in the Sunda Strait, observing the ongoing eruption.

In 1886-87 he was president of the Ship Examination Board (Schiffsprüfungskommission) and in the subsequent two years, Chief of Staff of the Admiralty. Now a Rear Admiral, Hollmann commanded the squadron which accompanied the Kaiser and Kaiserin on their royal visit to Greece and Turkey, 1889 to 1890.

On 22 April 1890, Hollmann became a member of the Federal Council (Bundesrat, upper house of the Parliament) and  State Secretary of the German Imperial Naval Office (Reichsmarineamt) in the cabinet of Chancellor Leo von Caprivi, following the resignation of  Karl Eduard Heusner. Here he planned naval construction and maintenance programs, directed the procurement of naval supplies, and represented the navy in the Reichstag. In the same year he was appointed Vice Admiral and in 1896, finally, Admiral.

He was conservative in his attitude to war and especially horrified when he heard talk of war with Britain. 

In the mid-1890s the quest for a German naval base in the Far East was uppermost in the minds of the naval leaders of the German Empire.  Many saw the First Sino-Japanese War (1894–95) as an opportunity to act. For Hollmann, bases were "an absolute necessity for overseas naval operations." In the heated discussions as to where the basse should be, he preferred Amoy on the Taiwan Strait. Nevertheless, when the Kaiser demanded that the navy take territory on the Shandong peninsula in September 1895, he demurred because of the uncertain reaction of Japan, Britain and Russia.

In the struggle over the Kaiser's naval expenditures, he admitted in February 1896 that "there are not 10 people in the Reichstag in favor of our great future fleet plans." He resigned in June 1897 because he could not prevail in getting the Kaiser's desired increases in the 1897 budget of the navy through the Reichstag. He promoted a navy of mainly cruisers as opposed to the heavy battle fleet sought by his successor, Alfred von Tirpitz.

Later life
Hollmann was appointed a member of the Prussian House of Lords in 1904. In 1906 he became the President of the Institute for Testing of Aerodynamic Models of the Powered Airship Society (Motorluftschiff-Studiengesellschaft) and its successor company, the Luft-Fahrzeug-Gesellschaft, which dealt with the construction, development and distribution of airships, including for the Navy.

On 27 January 1905 he was appointed to the Order of the Black Eagle.

He is one of the founders of the German Fleet Association (Deutsche Flottenverein).

After leaving the military Hollmann was a member of the supervisory board of the Allgemeine Elektrizitäts-Gesellschaft AEG, and later its chairman. He died in Berlin.

Footnotes

References

Further reading

1842 births
1913 deaths
Admirals of the Imperial German Navy
Members of the Prussian House of Lords
German military personnel of the Franco-Prussian War
Prussian naval officers
Military personnel from Berlin